Suat Okyar (born March 30, 1972) is a Turkish football coach and former footballer. Currently, he is the assistant coach of the Turkey national futsal team, and the head coach of the Turkey women's national football team.

He is the son of Vedat Okyar (1945–2009), former Beşiktaş J.K. footballer and captain as well as sports journalist.

References

External links

 Turkey - S. Okyar - Profile with news, career statistics and history - Soccerway

1972 births
Footballers from Istanbul
Turkish footballers
Turkish football managers
Turkey women's national football team managers
Living people
Vefa S.K. footballers
Pendikspor footballers
Bakırköyspor footballers
Association footballers not categorized by position
Ümraniyespor footballers